Rakesh Bhatnagar is an Indian educationist, scientist, and the current Vice Chancellor of Amity University Rajasthan. Previously he has served as the 27th Vice-Chancellor of Banaras Hindu University.

Early life 
He has an M. Sc. from Kanpur University and Phd from National Sugar Institute.

Career 
He has served as the dean of the school of biotechnology at Jawaharlal Nehru University (JNU), the Vice Chancellor of Kumaun University, the director of the academic staff college at JNU, and the director of the Advanced Instrumentation Research Facility at JNU. Dr. Bhatnagar also served as the Vice Chancellor of Banaras Hindu University, Varanasi. He helped develop a genetically engineered vaccine against anthrax. He is an elected fellow of several major Indian science academies and is a recipient of many honors, including the 2016 President of India Visitor's Award for Innovation. His team has also developed a DNA vaccine against Rabies. His research group has initiated research in other important infectious disease systems like Mycobacterium, Brucella; aiming to open avenues for their control. His areas of interest are Molecular Biology of Infectious Diseases, Recombinant Vaccine Development, and Programmed Cell Death in Prokaryotes.

References

Indian academic administrators
Banaras Hindu University people
Living people
1951 births
Scientists from Delhi